New Democracy is a stage of development in Maoism.

New Democracy may also refer to:
New Democracy (Andorra)
New Democracy (Canada), a defunct political party
New Democracy (Greece), a centre-right political party
Communist Party of India (Marxist–Leninist) New Democracy
New Democracy (Kosovo)
New Democracy (North Macedonia)
New Democracy (Portugal)
New Democracy (Serbia)
New Democracy (Sweden)
New Democracy (Slovakia)
New Democracy (Yugoslavia)

See also
New Democracy Party (disambiguation)
New Democratic Party (disambiguation)
The New Democrats, the French centre left political party
New Democrats, the ideological centrist faction of the Democratic Party in the United States
New Democrat Coalition, the caucus in the United States House of Representatives
Neo Democrats, a pro-democracy, localist political group in Hong Kong